Yvonne Lara da Costa (April 13, 1921 – April 16, 2018), better known as Dona Ivone Lara, was a Brazilian singer and composer.

Biography

Dona Ivone Lara was born as Yvonne Lara da Costa in Rio de Janeiro.  She graduated in nursing, with specialization in Occupational Therapy, and worked as a social worker until she retired in 1977. With this professional background, she worked in psychiatric hospitals, where she knew Nise da Silveira.

With the death of her mother when she was three, and of her father when she was twelve, Dona Ivone was raised by aunts and uncles and with them she learned to play the cavaquinho. She was exposed to samba music at the side of her cousin Mestre Fuleiro; she took singing lessons from Lucília Villa-Lobos and was praised by Dona Lucília's husband, the Brazilian composer Heitor Villa-Lobos.

At the age of 25, she married Oscar Costa, son of Afredo Costa, the president of the Prazer da Serrinha samba school. At Prazer da Serrinha she met several composers who later became her partners in several compositions, among them Mano Décio da Viola e Silas de Oliveira.

Dona Ivone composed the samba Nasci para sofrer (Born To Suffer), which became the theme song of the samba school. When the samba school Império Serrano was founded in 1947, she began to parade in the ala das baianas (Wing of the Baianas) during carnaval parades. There she composed the samba Não me perguntes (Don't Ask Me). Her consecration as a composer came in 1965, with Os cinco bailes da história do Rio (The Five Balls of the History of Rio), when she became the first woman to become part of the ala de compositores (Wing of the Composers) of a samba school.

Retiring from nursing in 1977, she began to dedicate herself to her musical career. She continued to record and to perform before live audiences. Among the interpreters of her songs are such singers and artists as Clara Nunes, Roberto Ribeiro, Maria Bethânia, Caetano Veloso, Gilberto Gil, Paula Toller, Paulinho da Viola, Beth Carvalho, Mariene de Castro e Roberta Sá.

Discography
1970 – Sambão 70
1972 – Quem samba fica?
1974 – Samba minha verdade, minha raiz
1979 – Sorriso de criança
1980 – Serra dos meus sonhos dourados
1981 – Sorriso negro
1982 – Alegria minha gente
1985 – Ivone Lara
1986 – Arte do encontro (com Jovelina Pérola Negra)
1998 –  Bodas de ouro
1999 – Um natal de samba (com Délcio Carvalho)
2001 – Nasci para sonhar e cantar
2004 – Sempre a cantar (com Toque de Prima)

See also
Liga Independente das Escolas de Samba do Rio de Janeiro

References

This article incorporates material translated from the article in the Portuguese language Wikipedia.

External links
 Official Website
 Official web site of the Império Serrano samba school 
 Veja Magazine- A nação das cantoras (in Portuguese)

1922 births
2018 deaths
Brazilian composers
20th-century Brazilian women singers
20th-century Brazilian singers
Samba musicians
Musicians from Rio de Janeiro (city)
Afro-Brazilian women singers
Women in Latin music